New Garden Township is a township in Chester County, Pennsylvania, United States, which was organized in 1714. The population was 11,363 at the 2020 census. New Garden is the center of the mushroom agribusiness in southeastern Pennsylvania with a higher concentration of composting, mushroom growing, packaging, and shipping businesses than in any other municipality in the area.  It was named for the New Garden Friends' Meeting House, an eighteenth-century brick house of worship of the Religious Society of Friends, within its territorial limits.

History
Merestone was added to the National Register of Historic Places in 1995.

Geography

Demographics

At the 2010 census, the township was 66.8% non-Hispanic White, 3.0% Black or African American, 0.5% Native American, 3.0% Asian, and 2.2% were two or more races. 26.4% of the population were of Hispanic or Latino ancestry.

As of the census of 2000, there were 9,083 people, 2,700 households, and 2,200 families residing in the township.  The population density was 562.9 people per square mile (217.3/km2).  There were 2,831 housing units at an average density of 175.5/sq mi (67.7/km2).  The racial makeup of the township was 84.91% White, 3.67% African American, 0.41% Native American, 1.30% Asian, 0.04% Pacific Islander, 8.07% from other races, and 1.61% from two or more races. Hispanic or Latino of any race were 22.73% of the population.

There were 2,700 households, out of which 46.9% had children under the age of 18 living with them, 70.6% were married couples living together, 6.4% had a female householder with no husband present, and 18.5% were non-families. 14.0% of all households were made up of individuals, and 4.5% had someone living alone who was 65 years of age or older.  The average household size was 3.16 and the average family size was 3.45.

In the township the population was spread out, with 30.7% under the age of 18, 8.2% from 18 to 24, 34.1% from 25 to 44, 19.7% from 45 to 64, and 7.2% who were 65 years of age or older.  The median age was 34 years. For every 100 females there were 119.2 males.  For every 100 females age 18 and over, there were 121.8 males.

The median income for a household in the township was $75,307, and the median income for a family was $89,812. Males had a median income of $54,524 versus $32,792 for females. The per capita income for the township was $30,364.  About 0.8% of families and 5.7% of the population were below the poverty line, including none of those under age 18 and 11.4% of those age 65 or over.

Transportation

U.S. Route 1 is the most prominent highway serving New Garden Township. It follows the Kennett Oxford Bypass along an east-west alignment across the northern portion of the township. Pennsylvania Route 41 is the only other numbered roads serving the township. It follows Gap Newport Pike along a northwest-southeast alignment through the middle of the township.

References

External links

New Garden Township

Townships in Chester County, Pennsylvania
1714 establishments in Pennsylvania